Chambellan is a surname. Notable people with the surname include: 

Jean-Pierre Chambellan (born 1958), French wrestler
Rene Paul Chambellan (1893–1955), American sculptor